Paul James Rainey (September 18, 1877 – September 18, 1923) was an American businessman, philanthropist, hunter, and photographer.

Biography

Paul James Rainey was born September 18, 1877, in Cleveland, Ohio, the fifth of Eleanor Beatty (née Mitchell) and William J. Rainey's five children.

Scion of a wealthy family whose fortune came from coal and coke production, Rainey earned a reputation as a playboy. He invested in numerous personal projects, including his Tippah Lodge in Mississippi, a hotel, prize horses, and private railroad cars.

Although he owned other residences, he favored Tippah Lodge, his sprawling estate in rural Mississippi.

Rainey was active with the American Geographical Society, American Museum of Natural History, the New York Zoological Society, and the Smithsonian Institution, among other organizations. 

Rejected by the military for health reasons, Rainey purchased an ambulance and drove it on the Western Front during World War I.

African expedition film

After the war, Rainey hunted big game in Africa. Rainey and his team filmed some of the earliest film footage of African animals in the wild. In 1912, a six-reel documentary film Paul J. Rainey's African Hunt was released.

Rainey's silent film grossed over a half-million dollars, an extraordinary sum for an early motion picture. It was one of the most successful non-fiction films of the decade. Rainey's safari team included a photographer and a taxidermist from the Smithsonian Institution. The success of Rainey's films led to a boom in expedition and nature films. These were silent films, so many of these films were at first presented by a lecturer in a lyceum-like context.

The Library of Congress has a copy of the film in its paper print collection. Producer Joseph P. Bickerton, Jr. organized the Jungle Film Corporation to buy and commercialize Rainey's African hunt footage. These films were the first motion pictures to be produced at regular theater prices and were successful in the U.S. and abroad.

Death and burial
He died on his forty-sixth birthday in 1923 of a cerebral hemorrhage. The death occurred while Rainey was en route from England to South Africa, where he had planned to hunt. He was buried at sea.

Legacy
After his death, Rainey's family set aside 26,000 acres (110 km2) of his marshland as a wildfowl refuge. Located in coastal south Louisiana, the refuge, known as the Paul J. Rainey Wildlife Sanctuary, is owned by the National Audubon Society. His sister commissioned the Rainey Memorial Gates at the Bronx Zoo in Bronx Park, New York City, as a memorial.

See also
 List of famous big game hunters

Further reading
Holliday, Peyton Elizabeth, (3 October 2022) Paul J. Rainey: Northeast Mississippi's Hidden Legend https://digitalcommons.liberty.edu/masters/922/

References

1877 births
1923 deaths
American businesspeople
American hunters
American philanthropists
Burials at sea